Dyspessa alipanahae is a moth in the family Cossidae. It was described by Yakovlev in 2008. It is found in Iran.

The length of the forewings is 11 mm for males and 12–14 mm for females.

References

Natural History Museum Lepidoptera generic names catalog

Dyspessa
Moths described in 2008
Moths of Asia